The Japanese destroyer  was one of 15 s built for the Imperial Japanese Navy (IJN) during the late 1910s. A decade later, the ship served as a plane guard. During the Pacific War, she was initially as the mother ship for a remotely controlled target ship and then became a radio-controlled target ship herself in 1942. Although she was badly damaged in mid-1945, Yakaze survived the war and was scrapped in 1948.

Design and description
The Minekaze class was designed with higher speed and better seakeeping than the preceding s. They were powered by two Parsons geared steam turbines, each driving one propeller shaft, using steam provided by four Kampon water-tube boilers. Their crew consisted of 148 officers and crewmen.

The main armament of the Minekaze-class ships consisted of four  Type 3 guns in single mounts; one gun forward of the superstructure, one between the two funnels, one aft of the rear funnel, and the last gun atop the aft superstructure. The guns were numbered '1' to '4' from front to rear. The ships carried three above-water twin sets of  torpedo tubes; one mount was in the well deck between the forward superstructure and the forward gun and the other two were between the aft funnel and aft superstructure. They could also carry 20 mines as well as minesweeping gear.

In 1937, Yakaze was converted into a radio control ship for the ex-battleship  that was serving as a target ship. As part of the conversion, her torpedo tubes were removed and her main armament was reduced to one or two 12 cm guns. On 20 July 1942, she was reclassified as a target ship for aircraft and her armament was reduced to a single  gun and four license-built  Type 96 light AA guns.

Construction and career
Yakaze, built at the Mitsubishi shipyard in Nagasaki, was laid down on 15 August 1918, launched on 20 April 1920 and completed on 19 July 1920. On commissioning, Yakaze was assigned to the Kure Naval District under the IJN 2nd Fleet.

At the time of the First Shanghai incident of 1932, Yakaze was engaged in river patrol duties along the Yangzi River in China. On 11 March 1939, she collided with the submarine . Due to damage and flooding incurred during the Attack on Yokosuka on 18 July 1945, she is towed to Nagaura and placed in No. 2 drydock, eventually sinking due to lack of repairmen. At the time of the surrender of Japan in September 1945, the Yakaze was still bottomed. Scrapped 1947.

Notes

References

 

 

Minekaze-class destroyers
Yakaze
1920 ships
World War II destroyers of Japan
Maritime incidents in 1939
Maritime incidents in July 1945